Mr. Grex of Monte Carlo is a surviving 1915 American drama silent film directed by Frank Reicher and written by Marion Fairfax and E. Phillips Oppenheim. The film stars Theodore Roberts, Dorothy Davenport, Carlyle Blackwell, James Neill, Horace B. Carpenter and Frank Elliott. The film was released on December 2, 1915, by Paramount Pictures. It is based on the novel of the same title by E. Phillips Oppenheim.

The film is preserved at the Library of Congress and BFI National Film and Television archive.

Synopsis
Shortly before the First World War, representatives of several different countries including the American millionaire Richard Lane and British secret service agent Lord Huntersley gather in Monte Carlo at the behest of a Russian Grand Duke living incognito as Mr. Grex. He plans to negotiate a secret pact between the various Great Powers. Matters are complicated when the American falls in love with the Grand Duke's daughter Feodora.

Cast 
Theodore Roberts as Mr. Grex
Dorothy Davenport as Grand Duchess Feodora
Carlyle Blackwell as Richard Lane
James Neill as Herr Selingman
Horace B. Carpenter as Mons. Pitou
Frank Elliott as Lord Huntersley 
John McDermott as Ernest 
Robert Gray as David 
Gertrude Kellar as Lady Wibourn
Lucien Littlefield as The Rag Picker

References

External links 
 
 
 The AFI Catalog of Feature Films:Mr. Grex of Monte Carlo

1915 films
1910s English-language films
Silent American drama films
1915 drama films
Paramount Pictures films
American black-and-white films
American silent feature films
Films based on British novels
Films set in Monaco
Films directed by Frank Reicher
1910s American films